Alide or ALIDE may refer to:

 Alide Dasnois (born 1950), South African journalist and newspaper editor
 Alide Maria Salvetta (1941–1991), Italian opera singer
 Alide: An Episode of Goethe's Life, an 1874 romance written by Emma Lazarus
 Liberal Alliance for Democracy (ALIDE), a political party in Burundi

Feminine given names